Jhataleka Malhotra is an Indian model and beauty queen. She was crowned the first runner-up in Femina Miss India 2014. She represented India at Miss International 2014 held in Japan where she won the Miss Internet Beauty award though she did not get placed.

Early life

Femina Miss India 2014
Malhotra participated in Femina Miss India 2014 and was crowned as Femina Miss India International 2014 by Sobhita Dhulipala. She also won Best National Costume award.

Miss International 2014
Malhotra competed in Miss International 2014 and won Miss Internet Beauty award at the pageant and her national costume, designed by Melvyn Noronha, was the 3rd runner-up.

Career
In 2021, Malhotra made her film debut, starring in Sanjay Leela Bhansali's romantic film Tuesdays And Fridays opposite actress Poonam Dhillon’s son, Anmol Thakeria Dhillon. The film released on 19 February.

Filmography

Films

References

External links

 
 

Living people
Miss International 2014 delegates
Female models from Mumbai
Year of birth missing (living people)